Daya Shankar Kaul "Nasim" (1811  1845) was an Urdu poet of the 19th century who is best known for his epic Gul Bakawali. He was defended by Brij Narayan Chakbast when it was suggested that he was not the author of this book.

References

Kaul Nasim, Daya Shankar
Kashmiri writers
Urdu-language poets from India
Kaul Nasim, Daya Shankar
Kaul Nasim, Daya Shankar
19th-century Indian poets